The Indians Are Still Far Away is a 1977 Swiss drama film directed by Patricia Moraz.

Cast
 Isabelle Huppert as Jenny
 Christine Pascal as Lise
 Mathieu Carrière as Matthias
 Chil Boiscuille as Guillaume
 Nicole Garcia as Anna
 Anton Diffring as Le professeur d'allemand
 Bernard Arczynski as Charles Dé (as Bernard Arczinsky)
 Jacques Adout as Le concierge du lycée (as Jacques Addou)
 Connie Grimsdale as La grand-mère
 Marina Bucher as Marianne
 Emmanuelle Ramu as Pascale
 Guillaume Rossier as Le garçon brun
 Catherine Cuenod as La prof de gym
 Claudia Togni as La serveuse
 René Herter as Le garçon du buffet

See also
 Isabelle Huppert on screen and stage

References

External links

Isabelle Huppert speaks about La Dentellière and Les Indiens sont encore loin on 20 May 1977

1977 films
Swiss drama films
1977 drama films
1970s French-language films
French-language Swiss films